SNB may refer to:

Beechcraft Model 18 aircraft, US Navy designation SNB-1 Kansan
National Security Service (Uzbekistan), transliteration of Cyrillic initials СНБ
Santa Fe Depot (San Bernardino), Amtrak station code SNB
Sbor národní bezpečnosti, national police in Czechoslovakia 1945-1991
Service New Brunswick, a crown corporation in Canada
Sunday Night Baseball, weekly ESPN broadcast
Serie Nacional de Béisbol, Cuba's top-level baseball league
Saudi National Bank (SNB), commercial bank in Saudi Arabia
Swiss National Bank, the central bank of Switzerland
Snake Bay Airport, IATA airport code "SNB"